Bassleton Wood and The Holmes is a Local Nature Reserve in the town of Thornaby-on-Tees, in the borough of Stockton-on-Tees, England.

Bassleton Wood is an ancient woodland.  The Holmes follows the course of the River Tees and provides a haven for wildlife such as roe deer have been seen within the nature reserve. Within The Holmes there is a wildlife pond that features some of the most rare species in northern England.

References

Thornaby-on-Tees
Local Nature Reserves in North Yorkshire
Forests and woodlands of North Yorkshire